Artur Akhsarovich Kulumbegov (born 6 August 1982) is a former Russian professional football player.

Club career
He played 6 seasons in the Russian Football National League for 5 different teams.

References

External links
 

1982 births
Sportspeople from Vladikavkaz
Living people
Russian footballers
Association football midfielders
FC Saturn Ramenskoye players
FC Spartak Vladikavkaz players
FC Zvezda Irkutsk players
FC Dynamo Bryansk players
FC Dynamo Stavropol players
FC Spartak-MZhK Ryazan players
FC Dynamo Makhachkala players